Pressly Hemingway Matthews (21 February 190325 September 1967) was a New Zealand politician and the second leader (1960–1962) of New Zealand's Social Credit Party.

Biography
He became leader in 1960 for the 1960 general election but the campaign opening was a disaster as he altered his address just before the opening meeting, and three candidates missed the nomination deadline. He was replaced by Vernon Cracknell in 1962. Zavos describes Mr Presley (sic) Matthews as an obscure (even to Social Crediters) leader.

Matthews had been a broadcasting technician and unionist in Auckland; he was first president (1934) of the Radio Workers Union and worker’s representative on the Arbitration Court. He was also a local activist in Orakei, and had been in the Labour Party for many years until he resigned in 1939.

About 1951 he moved to Tākaka to farm, and formed a branch of Social Credit.

In May 1960 Matthews was elected party leader and his 1960 manifesto proposed policies such as introducing a Bill of Rights to limit the powers of Government, free travel to pensioners on Government-owned services outside of holiday periods, rationalising trading hours and holding a referendum on the liquor licensing debate.

He died in Tākaka in 1967, aged 64.

References

Who's Who in New Zealand (7th edition, 1961)
Crusade: Social Credit’s drive for power by Spiro Zavos, page 81 (1981, INL Print, Lower Hutt) 

Buller electoral roll 1957: Matthews, Pressly Hemingway, Central Takaka, company director.

1903 births
1967 deaths
Leaders of political parties in New Zealand
New Zealand trade unionists
New Zealand farmers
Social Credit Party (New Zealand) politicians
New Zealand Labour Party politicians
Unsuccessful candidates in the 1960 New Zealand general election
New Zealand community activists
People from Tākaka